2013–14 in Swedish bandy was a bandy season starting in August 2013 and ending in July 2014.

Honours

Men's bandy

Official titles

Competitions

Women's bandy

Official titles

Promotions, relegations and qualifications

Promotions

Relegations

2014 Elitserien play-offs 

Final

National teams

Sweden national bandy team

2014 Bandy World Championship 

In the 2014 Bandy World Championship, Sweden played in Division A, Group A. Sweden played the following matches and won the silver medals.

Sweden women's national bandy team

2014 Women's Bandy World Championship 

In the 2014 Women's Bandy World Championship, Sweden played the following matches and won the silver medals, for the first time not becoming world champions.

See also
 2013–14 Elitserien (bandy)
 Swedish bandy league system

References

Seasons in Swedish bandy
Bandy
Bandy
Sweden
Sweden